Emily the Strange is an illustrated fictional character featured in several comic books, graphic novels and in various merchandise and clothing lines. She was created by Rob Reger for his company Cosmic Debris Etc. Inc. located in San Francisco, California.

History
She first appeared on Santa Cruz Skateboards professional skater Ross Goodman's skateboard graphics.  Nathan Carrico, graphic artist and creative director, designed Emily in 1991 for Santa Cruz Skateboards in Santa Cruz, California.

Publications
Emily the Strange is published in several formats by publishers including Chronicle Books, Dark Horse Comics, and later HarperCollins.

The Chronicle Books hardback graphic novellas include:
Emily the Strange (2001)
Emily's Secret Book of Strange (2003)
Emily's Good Nightmares (2005)
Emily's Seeing Is Deceiving (2006)

In 2005, the first two issues of the comic book series were released by Dark Horse Comics—"The Boring Issue" (#1) and "The Lost Issue" (#2). "The Dark Issue" (#3) was published in 2006. The collected edition of the first three comic books (Emily the Strange: Lost, Dark, and Bored) was published in November 2006.  The fourth offering, "The Rock Issue" (#4), was published in 2007.  An ongoing, monthly, standard-length series has been published since March 2008.

Dark Horse Comics announced the publication of The Art of Emily Volume One, the first collection of images showing the wide and inspired range of artistic styles and mediums that have been used to create the world of Emily the Strange: silk-screened vinyl skateboard stickers to custom rock-and-roll album art, large-scale psychedelic paintings, and intricate Mongolian paper cutting, the fantastic and artful imaginings of Rob Reger, Buzz Parker, and a large number of collaborators.

Since 2008 Emily the Strange has been published in France by Soleil Productions.

In October 2007, it was first announced that four young adult novels based on the Emily the Strange character will be published by HarperCollins. They will be co-written by Rob Reger and Jessica Gruner.

The first HarperCollins novel, Emily the Strange:  The Lost Days, was released in June 2009.  Written in a diary format, it opens with Emily attempting to recover her memory and regain her sense of style. Co-Author, Rob Reger says the book maps new territory inside the mind of his popular character. "In the past, it’s been us describing her," he says. "This is the first time anybody gets to hear how she talks to herself and her cats.".

The next book in HarperCollins' four-book series, Emily the Strange: Stranger and Stranger, was released in March 2010. In this book Emily is back in Blandindulle and preparing to move to a new town. While experimenting with her supply of Blackrock and duplicating device she accidentally clones herself. Enjoying the benefit of a second Emily at first, the real Emily comes across problems such as identity crisis and loss of some of her unique talents. Not to mention the fact that her clone thinks she is the real Emily and evidently plans to end Emily Strange for good.

The third HarperCollins book, Emily the Strange: Dark Times was released on December 27, 2011. Emily is in Duntztown when she needs a student ID to obtain a discount at the local hardware store. After going to school and borrowing an ID, she decides to homeschool herself literally, as opposed to lying about it in the past two books. During a seminar "History of the Strange Family 101", Emily finds out that her Great-Aunt Lily died by white fever at age 13, though she had healing powers and could probably heal herself. A rumor that a Dark Aunt caused her death is spreading too. Emily goes to Blackrock to find black rock for her Time Out Machine, only to find that Blackrock is not there and that the caravan is with her. She learns about Boris, Attikol's ancestor, and decides to time travel into 1790 to save Lily and take Boris off her tail using a moving, severed cat's tail.

The fourth and final HarperCollins book, Emily the Strange: Piece of Mind was also released on December 27, 2011. It includes:

1. The Thought Thief
2. Ancestral enemies (and a few ancestral friends)
3. Modern-day Seasidetown
4. FelinoMobileTranscriptoSpy devices
5. Abandoned souvenir kiosk
6. Jakey's memories
7. Super secret book vault
8. Stolen blueprints
9. Regret Maneuvers A through Z
10. Final exams in Particle Physics and How-to With Glue
11. Hero-worshipping engineers
12. The 13th Dark Girl
13. Black rock

On January 30, 2013, Dark Horse Comics and Rob Reger brought Emily and The Strangers #1. And then in March came Emily and The Strangers #2. In July came Emily and The Strangers #3.

Comic Book series

Collected Comic Book editions
Emily the Strange is collected in trade paperbacks and limited-edition hardcovers, each including extra material from the original publications.

Harper Collins young adult novel series
In June 2009, Emily the Strange: The Lost Days was first published through HarperCollins’ children imprint branch. Subsequently, three more young adult novels followed, all written by Rob Reger and Jessica Gruner, and illustrated by Rob Reger and Buzz Parker.

Brand expansion
The Emily the Strange franchise has a considerable merchandising catalog, including clothing, stationery, stickers and fashion accessories.  All of the products feature Emily's distinctive appearance and frequently feature one of her cynical sayings such as "Get Lost," "Be All You Can't Be," or "Wish You Weren't Here".

Retail stores

Cosmic Debris has opened four Emily the Strange flagship stores to date (Taiwan, Taipei, Hong Kong and Greece), with plans to open Emily the Strange retail stores in the Americas in the following years.

In 2005, the company partnered with British punk rock band The Damned, in the release and artwork for their single Little Miss Disaster. Other co-branding alliances and partnerships have included Jones Soda, Gibson Guitars, Zippo, and Manic Panic (hair coloring, nail polishes and colorful extensions).

Clothing
In July/August 2003 V magazine ran a double page spread of clothing inspired by the character, created by Chanel, Gautier, Helmut Lang, Marc Jacobs, and others. Emily has been shown in Vanilla Sky and on MADtv. Celebrities including Julia Roberts, Britney Spears, and Björk have all worn the brand. Epiphone has created an Emily the Strange-themed SG guitar, based on an Epiphone G-310, with a bolt-on neck, customized Emily the Strange graphics, and a special strap.

Since 2010 Emily the Strange apparel is manufactured and distributed by Italian company Pier Spa.

Video game
The official Emily the Strange video game Strangerous has been developed by Exozet Games and was released by UK publisher PQube on June 10, 2011.

Strangerous for Nintendo DS and Nintendo DSi is a puzzle and adventure story based around Emily the Strange and her missing kittens spanning 6 chapters and over 60 puzzles.

The official website for the game is emily-game.co.uk

Exozet Games has also developed the game Emily the Strange – Skate Strange, published by DTP Young for iPhone and Android smartphones.

In other media
Rob Reger designed and included the Emily the Strange cartoon in a 12-page foldout booklet for the album BatBox by Miss Kittin in 2008.

Since 2000, Rob Reger has been trying to make a feature film adaptation of Emily. In 2005, it was reported that Fox Animation would make a live action/animated feature film, with Chris Meledandri and John Cohen producing it. In 2008, it was reported that Mike Richardson, of Dark Horse Entertainment, had come on board as a producer. The same year it was unofficially reported that the film had moved to Universal Studios' owned Illumination Entertainment, along with the studio's founders, Meledandri and Cohen. In September 2010, it was reported that Universal Studios had acquired the rights to the comic, and that the actress Chloë Grace Moretz had been cast in the role of Emily. In August 2011, it was announced that Melisa Wallack, who wrote the script for Mirror Mirror, had been hired to write the adaptation. Two months later it was confirmed that the film was indeed in the works at Illumination Entertainment. Kealan O’Rourke will rewrite the film's script. In December 2016, it was reported that Universal had abandoned the project, and that Dark Horse Entertainment and Amazon Studios were in negotiations to make an animated film.

Cats
Emily is usually shown accompanied by four black cats. Sabbath, the newest cat to join the Strange family, is usually identified by a tear on one of his ears and one bent whisker. Miles, the most artistic cat of the group and also the fastest, is identified by his pointy ears, X-mark over his right eye and two pointy whiskers. Nee Chee, the thinker of the group (also known as the schemer), is identified by the black and white stripes on his tail caused by a chemical spill, as well as three whiskers. Mystery, the leader of the group and the only female of the four cats, seems to be the closest to Emily, and therefore thought to be the cat that has been with Emily the longest. Mystery is identified by the star on her collar, one curly whisker and occasionally a star on her left eye.

Character origin controversy

The very first Emily the Strange illustration dates from 1991, but the 1978 children's book Nate the Great Goes Undercover features a very similar illustration of a young girl named Rosamond. She also has long black hair and is frequently accompanied by her black cats. When Rosamond is introduced she wears a short dress and white Mary Jane shoes, similar to Emily, and in a similar pose.

This illustration is accompanied by the text, "Rosamond did not look hungry or sleepy. She looked like she always looks. Strange." The first Emily the Strange design by Cosmic Debris says: "Emily did not look tired or happy. She looked like she always looks. Strange."

When Rosamond's creators, Marjorie Sharmat and Marc Simont, allegedly began contacting companies who had contracts related to Emily the Strange and urged them to drop their relationships with Cosmic Debris, Cosmic Debris sued Sharmat and Simont. Sharmat and Simont counter-sued. "Emily the Strange, like Rosamond, is a young girl in a short dress, black tights, and Mary Jane shoes. Emily, like Rosamond, has long dark hair with square-cut bangs. Emily, like Rosamond, is typically attended by four black cats. Emily, like Rosamond, is described as being strange and has a fascination with dark themes," alleged the complaint.

Cosmic Debris contended that Emily and Rosamond both drew from a tradition of similar characters including Vampira and Wednesday Addams, and argued that while the text of the initial Emily illustration was nearly identical with Sharmat's text, that illustration had been withdrawn in 1998 and the statute of limitations had therefore run out.

On August 12, 2009, creator of Emily the Strange and the creators of Nate the Great jointly announced an agreement resolving all disputes between them. Each side agreed to give up all claims against the other as part of their settlement. "We recognize that Emily and Rosamond are both unique and original characters, and we are pleased that we were able to resolve this dispute," said Marjorie Sharmat and Marc Simont.  "We wish Rob, Cosmic Debris, Emily and her fans all the very best."

Notes

References

External links

Rob Reger interview on Current.TV
Buzz Parker's website
Official Emily the strange EU Webstore 
Official Emily the Strange YouTube channel
Emily the Strange Tooncasts (animations)
Emily the Strange has reason to smile: She's got her own media empire  June 2008 interview with the New York Daily News.
Emily the Strange is seein' red – and green, and blue  September 2008 Emily and Manic Panic's new hair and cosmetics products.
Emily the Strange at Dark Horse Comics

Dark Horse Comics titles
Gothic fashion
Comics characters introduced in 1991
Music mascots
Goth subculture